Godfred Yeboah Dame (born 5 June 1979) is a Ghanaian lawyer and politician. He is a member of the New Patriotic Party. He was previously the deputy Attorney General and Minister of Justice. He is currently the Attorney General.

Early life and education 

Godfred Yeboah Dame was born on 5 June 1979. He had his secondary school education at the Adisadel College in Cape coast, Central Region from 1989 to 1996. He attended the University of Ghana where he completed with a Bachelor of Laws degree (LLB) in 2001. He moved to the Ghana School of Law where he obtained his professional certificate to practice law and was called to the Ghana Bar in 2003. He worked as private legal practitioner before entering politics.

Politics 
Dame is a member of the New Patriotic Party. In March 2017, he was appointed by President Akufo-Addo to serve as  deputy Attorney General and deputy Minister of Justice. On 21 January 2021, after his party retained power in the December 2020 election, he was elevated to the position of substantive Attorney General and Minister of Justice to replace Gloria Akuffo.

Personal life 
Dame is married to Dr. Joycelyn Akosua Assimeng Dame, a paediatric infectious disease specialist and they have two children. He is a Christian.

References 

Living people
1979 births
New Patriotic Party politicians
Alumni of Adisadel College
University of Ghana alumni
Ghana School of Law alumni
21st-century Ghanaian lawyers
Attorneys General of Ghana